The List of Marjan Šarec (Slovene: Lista Marjana Šarca, LMŠ) was a political party in Slovenia led by former Prime Minister Marjan Šarec. It merged into the Freedom Movement in the aftermath of the 2022 elections.

History
Marjan Šarec, a former journalist, actor, and comedian, founded the party (initially as List of Marjan Šarec – Onward Kamnik) during his first mayoral term to contest the 2014 Slovenian Local Elections providing candidates for the municipal council of Kamnik. For most of Šarec's second term as mayor of Kamnik, the party was active only at the local level.

Šarec contested the 2017 presidential election, advancing to the runoff but narrowly losing to incumbent President Borut Pahor. After announcing his much speculated entry into parliamentary politics, LMŠ swiftly topped public opinion polls, emerging as the foremost party leading into the 2018 Slovenian parliamentary election.

In an interview with the weekly political magazine Mladina, Šarec argued against comparisons of LMŠ with Mayor Zoran Janković's Positive Slovenia and incumbent PM Miro Cerar's Modern Centre Party (SMC) which both emerged as preeminent political forces after being established just months prior to parliamentary elections. He has spoken out in favour of judicial, regulatory, procedural, and electoral reforms (including the introduction of preferential voting, and raising the parliamentary threshold to achieve more stable governments), rectifying the inefficient healthcare system, and doing more to address climate change (including an expansion of the Krško Nuclear Power Plant). He has also expressed opposition to privatising infrastructural and strategic firms (and the complete privatisation of the banking sector), argued in favour of running a balanced budget and reducing the public debt (if this was allowed for by future economic growth), and reform of the pension system, including by promoting private pension schemes. He has stated the party will be willing to politically cooperate with anyone, except for "people who are involved in any suspicious deals". The party has expressed support for the complete legalisation of cannabis.

On his electoral website, Šarec listed advocacy for public education and healthcare, environmental responsibility, intergenerational cooperation, transparency and meritocracy, and research and development as some of the integral components of his political vision. He also declared his unwavering support for abortion rights, called for tolerance of homosexuality, and linked true socialism with the social teachings of Jesus Christ.

The party received 12.6% of the vote in the 2018 parliamentary election held on 3 June 2018, winning 13 seats in parliament. The party became the largest component of the Šarec government formed on 13 September 2018, in coalition with the SMC, Social Democrats, Party of Alenka Bratušek and Democratic Party of Pensioners of Slovenia.

The LMS joined the Alliance of Liberals and Democrats for Europe Party on 9 November 2018.

In the 2019 European election held on 26 May 2019, the LMS came in third place nationally, receiving 15.6% of the vote and electing two MEPs to the Renew Europe European Parlament group.

Electoral results

National Assembly

European Parliament

Presidential

References

External links

2014 establishments in Slovenia
Alliance of Liberals and Democrats for Europe Party member parties
Centrist parties in Slovenia
Christian political parties
Liberal parties in Slovenia
Populist parties
Political parties established in 2014
Political parties disestablished in 2022
Pro-European political parties in Slovenia
Social liberal parties